Sure Fire is a 1921 American silent Western film directed by John Ford and featuring Hoot Gibson. It is considered to be a lost film.

Plot
As described in a film magazine, easy going rancher Jeff Bransford (Gibson) returns to his ancestral acres and finds them heavily mortgaged and about to be foreclosed and the hired men defended them with guns. He tries to borrow money to satisfy the mortgage but is unsuccessful. That night a robbery is committed on a neighboring farm with five thousand dollars stolen from Major Parker (MacQuarrie), and suspicion is thrown upon Jeff. After much hard riding and several stiff fights, the real culprits are apprehended and Jeff is vindicated. Parker had intended to loan Jeff some money to help with his difficulties. In return, Jeff saves the married Elinor Parker (Brunette) from running away with a worthless scamp and causing a scandal.

Cast
 Hoot Gibson as Jeff Bransford
 Molly Malone as Marian Hoffman
 B. Reeves Eason Jr. as Sonny (credited as Breezy Eason Jr.)
 Harry Carter as Rufus Coulter
 Fritzi Brunette as Elinor Parker
 Murdock MacQuarrie as Major Parker
 George Fisher as Burt Rawlings
 Charles Newton as Leo Ballinger
 Jack Woods as Brazos Bart
 Jack Walters as Overland Kid
 Joe Harris as Romero
 Steve Clemente as Gomez (credited as Steve Clements)
 Mary Philbin

See also
 Hoot Gibson filmography

References

External links

 
 

1921 films
1921 lost films
1921 Western (genre) films
American black-and-white films
Films directed by John Ford
Lost American films
Lost Western (genre) films
Silent American Western (genre) films
Universal Pictures films
1920s American films